This University of Denver alumni includes those who have studied at or graduated from the University of Denver.

Scientists 
Henry Otley Beyer, father of anthropology and ethnology in the Philippines.
Asa Grant Hilliard III, egyptologist and professor of educational psychology.
Arnold Kramish(1923–2010), nuclear physicist on the Manhattan Project who was almost killed in a radioactive explosion
Lula Lubchenco, pediatrician who researched the relationships between gestational age and birth weight.
Henry T. Lynch, cancer researcher, considered one of the "fathers of cancer genetics"
Valentino Mazzia (1922–1999), forensic anesthesiologist.
Frances McConnell-Mills (1900–1975), toxicologist.
Donald Menzel, one of America's first astrophysicists, former director of Harvard College Observatory.
David Pion-Berlin, political scientist, academic, author and scholar. 
Myrtle L. Richmond, astronomical researcher at Mount Wilson Observatory, 1913 to 1947.
Anne Roe, clinical psychologist and researcher.
Del Thiessen, psychology theorist.
Cleo Spurlock Wallace, child speech therapist; founder of Wallace Village.

Politics, government and military 
Sheikh Ahmed bin Saeed Al Maktoum President of the Dubai Civil Aviation Authority.
Frank Aguon, Guam Senator.
Dr. Ibrahim Abdulaziz Al-Assaf, Foreign Minister, Saudi Arabia.
Carl Anderson, former Special Assistant to President Reagan; current Supreme Knight/CEO of the Knights of Columbus.
Owen Aspinall, 45th Governor of American Samoa. 
Wayne Aspinall, former member, U.S. House of Representatives (D-Colo.)
W. Meredith Bacon, political scientist; LGBT rights activist.
César Vásquez Bazán, former Minister of Economy and Finance of Peru.
Ann Bedsole, Alabama Republican politician.
Charles Brannan, former U.S. Secretary of Agriculture under President Truman
Paula Broadwell, bestselling author; extramarital partner of David Petraeus
 Robyn Brody, associate justice of the Idaho Supreme Court
Terrance Carroll, Speaker of the Colorado House of Representatives.
George W. Casey, Jr., four-star general and 36th Chief of Staff of the United States Army, former commander of U.S. forces in Iraq.
Oscar Chapman, former U.S. Secretary of Interior under President Truman.
Mary Cheney, political activist; daughter of former Vice President Dick Cheney.
Cindy Courville, former U.S. Ambassador to the African Union.
Jason Crow, Member, U.S House of Representatives (D-Colo.)
Robert Dieter, U.S. Ambassador to Belize.
 Pete Domenici, former U.S. Senator (R-N.M.).
 Byron Dorgan, former U.S. Senator (D-N.D.)
 Mike Enzi, former U.S. Senator (R-Wyo.)
Floyd Esquibel, member of the Wyoming Senate; former member of the Wyoming House of Representatives
William D. Ford, former member, U.S. House of Representatives (D-Mich.)
John V. Garza, member, Texas House of Representatives (R-San Antonio)
Peter Groff, President, Colorado Senate
John Grubesic, New Mexico State Senator, representing the 25th District as a Democrat
Millie Hamner, member of the Colorado House of Representatives; former school district superintendent for Summit County, Colorado
Loy Henderson, former U.S. Ambassador to Iran
Najma Heptulla, current member of Upper House of the Indian Parliament
G. Kathleen Hill, current U.S. Ambassador to Malta
Ahmad Ismail, mayor of Kuala Lumpur, Malaysia
Howard Jenkins Jr., former civil servant and labor lawyer
Katherine Karađorđević, Princess of Serbia
Fred Karger, campaign strategist; 2012 presidential candidate; first ever openly gay candidate
Michelle Kwan, former U.S. Olympic figure skating medalist; current U.S. Ambassador to Belize
Paul Laxalt, former Nevada governor and U.S. Senator (R-Nev.)
Clarence F. Lea, former member, U.S. House of Representatives (D-California)
John Arthur Love, former Governor of Colorado; Director of U.S. Energy Policy under President Nixon
Fred Mahaffey, DU football all-American and youngest US Army four-star general
David Malpass, President, The World Bank Group
Azlan Man, Menteri Besar (Chief Minister) of the Malaysian state of Perlis
Mike McKevitt, former member, U.S, House of Representatives (R-Colo.)
Jami Miscik, former Deputy Director for Intelligence at the CIA; Vice-Chairman of Kissinger Associates, Inc. in New York
Massouma al-Mubarak, Kuwait's first woman Cabinet Minister.
Heraldo Muñoz, Current Chilean Foreign Minister, former Chilean Ambassador to the United Nations
Shahzada Jamal Nazir, former Federal Minister for ministries of National Health Services, Religious Affairs, National Heritage & Integration and National Harmony, Government of Pakistan;  former adviser/Minister of State for the Government of Pakistan
Reynold Nesiba, South Dakota state senator
James Nicholson, former Secretary of Veterans Affairs under President G.W. Bush
Gale Norton, former U.S. Secretary of the Interior under President G.W. Bush
Condoleezza Rice, former National Security Advisor and U.S. Secretary of State under President G.W. Bush
Byron Rogers, former member, U.S. House of Representatives (D-Colo.)
Andrew Romanoff, former Colorado (D) House Speaker; 2010 U.S. Senate Candidate (Colo.)
Ed Schafer, former U.S. Secretary of Agriculture under President G.W. Bush; former Governor of North Dakota
 Richard Stark, current Florida State House member (D-FL)
Paul Trivelli, former U.S. Ambassador to Nicaragua
 Susan Waltz, Chair of International Executive Committee, Amnesty International; professor of public policy at Gerald R. Ford School of Public Policy, University of Michigan
Mo Udall, former member, U.S. House of Representatives (D-Ariz)
Alvin Wiederspahn, law school graduate; former member of both houses of the Wyoming legislature; prominent Cheyenne attorney and historical preservationist
Jerre Stockton Williams, expert in labor law; first Chairman of the Administrative Conference of the United States; professor of law at The University of Iowa College of Law (1941–1942), University of Denver (1946), and The University of Texas School of Law (1946–1980); President, Association of American Law Schools (1980); Judge, United States Court of Appeals for the Fifth Circuit (1980–1993)
John Patrick Williams, former member, U.S. House of Representatives (D-Mont.)
Mohammad Javad Zarif, Minister of Foreign Affairs, Islamic Republic of Iran

Business and industry
Sheikh Ahmed bin Saeed Al Maktoum, Chairman/CEO of Emirates Airlines
Brad Anderson, former CEO of Best Buy
 Dean Baker (born 1958), macroeconomist
Roger Birnbaum, CEO and co-founder of Spyglass Entertainment; former Chairman and CEO of MGM Studios
Emily Cinader, Former CEO,J. Crew
Peter Coors, Chairman of Molson Coors Brewing Company
Debra Crew, CEO and President of Diageo North America
Heidi Ganahl, founder of Camp Bow Wow chain
Ruth Handler, former President of Mattel, Inc. 
Richard Hilton, chairman of Hilton and Hyland Real Estate
Ian Ivarson, founder of IVAR, a brand of backpacks and bags
Elrey Jeppesen, aviation pioneer; founder of Jeppesen and Co., an aviation charting company today owned by Boeing
Jay Kemmerer, Chairman of Jackson Hole Mountain Resort
James C. Kennedy, former CEO and current Chairman of Cox Enterprises
Ted J. Kleisner, President and CEO of Hershey Entertainment & Resorts Company
Lewis Kornfeld, former CEO of Radio Shack
Jim Lentz, President and CEO of Toyota North America
Jeffrey Lorberbaum, Chairman and CEO of Mohawk Industries
Emmit McHenry, technology entrepreneur; founder of Network Solutions
Peter Morton, founder of Hard Rock Cafe chain
Marc Nathanson, Billionaire founder of Falcon Cable, Biden nominee as ambassador to Norway
Duane D. Pearsall, inventor of the battery-powered home smoke detector
Scott Mitchell Rosenberg, CEO/Chairman of Platinum Studios; founder of Malibu Comics; screenwriter of Con Air and Men in Black
Joseph Saunders, Chairman and CEO of Visa Inc.
Andrew C. Taylor, CEO of Enterprise Rent-A-Car
Carol Tome, CEO of United Parcel Service
Dale Wolf, CEO, Coventry Health Care

Media
Alan Berg, former attorney; murdered radio talk show host
Bob Berkowitz, former CNN White House correspondent, ABC News and NBC's Today Show
Clarke Canfield, Associated Press reporter and author
James W. "Jim" Case, program director, KRMA-TV
James L. Conway, producer and director, Charmed, Smallville, 90210, Star TrekRonnie Cramer, film director
Jargalsaikhan Dambadarjaa, Mongolian economist, television host, writer, and political commentator
Edward W. Estlow, former CEO of E.W. Scripps Company
Peter Funt, President and host of Candid CameraMerle Harmon, sports broadcaster, ABC and NBC TV, many MLB and NFL teams
Aaron Huey, photojournalist and contributing editor, Harper's WeeklyJames C. Kennedy, Chairman, former CEO, Cox Enterprises
Louise Martin, journalistic photographer, Houston Forward Times and Houston Informer
Bill Mercer, sports play-by-play announcer, Dallas Cowboys, Texas Rangers, and World Class Championship Wrestling; retired faculty member from University of North Texas
Mike Rosen, conservative talk radio host
Andrew Rosenthal, editorial page editor, The New York TimesBill Scott (voice actor), writer and voice artist, The Adventures of Rocky and Bullwinkle and Friends
Ed Stein, editorial cartoonist, Rocky Mountain NewsLowell Thomas, radio commentator
David Von Drehle, Columnist, Washington Post, former editor-at-large for Time magazine and author
Jon Taffer, host and creator, Bar Rescue television show, SpikeTV

Sports

Bruce Affleck, former NHL player; now chief operating officer of St. Louis Blues
Glenn Anderson, Hockey Hall of Fame wing and who scored 498 career NHL goals and won six Stanley Cups, 1980 Canadian Olympian
Erik Andersson, former NHL forward with Calgary Flames
Bob Balog, former NFL center/linebacker with Pittsburgh Steelers
Trevor Baptiste, PLL All-Star lacrosse player with Atlas Lacrosse Club, Philadelphia Wings
Byron Beck, ABA and NBA Denver Nuggets basketball star in 1960s and 70s, number 40 retired by team
Wesley Berg, PLL lacrosse player with Redwoods Lacrosse Club, San Diego Seals
Adam Berkhoel, former NHL goaltender with Atlanta Thrashers
Eddy Beers, former NHL forward with Calgary Flames and St. Louis Blues
Beau Bennett, former NHL forward with Arizona Coyotes, St. Louis Blues, New Jersey Devils, Pittsburgh Penguins
Doug Berry, former NHL forward with Colorado Avalanche
Ken Berry, former NHL forward with Edmonton Oilers and Vancouver Canucks, two-time Canadian Olympian (1980, 1988)
Jerome Biffle, 1952 US Olympic gold medalist in the long jump
Steve Blateric, former MLB pitcher, New York Yankees, Cincinnati Reds, and California Angels
Ray Boggs, former MLB pitcher with Boston Braves
Nat Borchers, former MLS soccer defender with Portland Timbers, Real Salt Lake, Colorado Rapids and US National Team 
Henrik Borgström, NHL center with Chicago Blackhawks and Florida Panthers 
Vince Boryla, 1948 US Olympic gold medalist, NBA player with New York Knicks, NBA head coach and long-time NBA executive
Henry Bostick, former MLB third baseman with Philadelphia Athletics
Tyler Bozak, NHL forward with St. Louis Blues and Toronto Maple Leafs
Lyle Bradley, former NHL player with California Golden Seals and Cleveland Barons 
Rick Bragnalo, former NHL player with Washington Capitals
Bobby Brink, forward with Philadelphia Flyers
Gregg Browning, NFL tight end with New York Giants
Mike Busniuk, former NHL player with Philadelphia Flyers
Will Butcher, NHL defenseman with Buffalo Sabres and New Jersey Devils and 2017 Hobey Baker Award Winner
Chris Butler, former NHL defenseman with the St. Louis Blues, Calgary Flames and Buffalo Sabres
Ryan Caldwell, former NHL defenseman with New York Islanders and Phoenix Coyotes
Matt Carle, former NHL defenseman with Tampa Bay Lightning, Philadelphia Flyers and San Jose Sharks 2007 NHL all-Rookie team and 2006 Hobey Baker Award winner
Don Carlsen, former MLB pitcher with Chicago Cubs and Pittsburgh Pirates
Suzy Chaffee, former Olympic, World Cup and professional freestyle skier, known as "Suzy Chapstick"
Mike Christie, former NHL player with Colorado Avalanche, Cleveland Barons, Vancouver Canucks and California Golden Seals
Joe Colborne, former NHL forward with Colorado Avalanche, Calgary Flames, Toronto Maple Leafs and Boston Bruins
Paul Comrie, former NHL forward with Edmonton Oilers
Ed Cristofoli, former NHL forward with Montreal Canadiens
Courtney Dauwalter, America's Top-Ranked Ultra-Distance Runner
Kevin Dineen, former NHL all-star player; former head coach, Florida Panthers, 1984 Canadian Olympian and Gold Medal Coach of Canadian Women's Team at 2014 Sochi Olympics
Kevin Doell, former NHL forward with Atlanta Thrashers
Matt Donovan, NHL defenseman with Nashville Predators
Ferd Dreher, former NFL football player with Chicago Bears
Wade Dubielewicz, former NHL goaltender with New York Islanders, Columbus Blue Jackets and Minnesota Wild
Reagan Dunk, former MLS soccer defender, Real Salt Lake
Burak Elmas, President, Galatasaray Soccer Club, Istanbul, Turkey
Sam Etcheverry, NFL QB with St. Louis Cardinals, also Canadian Football League Hall of Fame player and coach
Kortne Ford, MLS soccer defender with Colorado Rapids 
Dylan Gambrell, NHL forward with Ottawa Senators and San Jose Sharks
Dallas Gaume, former NHL forward with Hartford Whalers and all-time leading scorer for DU hockey (266 points)
Gabe Gauthier, former NHL hockey player with Los Angeles Kings
Ron Grahame, former NHL goaltender with Boston Bruins, Los Angeles Kings and Quebec Nordiques
Mark Grimmette, with Brian Martin, two-time U.S. Olympic medalist luge pair in 1998 and 2002 Olympics
Cole Guttman, NHL forward with Chicago Blackhawks 
Gil Hanse, golf course architect (Rio 2016 Olympic Course, Doral Golf Club)
Kristen Hamilton, NWSL professional soccer player, North Carolina Courage and US National Team
Phil Heath, professional bodybuilder, seven-time Mr. Olympia winner
Ronnie Harrell (born 1996), basketball player for Hapoel Gilboa Galil of the Israeli Basketball Premier League
Danton Heinen, NHL hockey forward with Pittsburgh Penguins, Anaheim Ducks and Boston Bruins
Keri Herman, Free Style Skier with five X Games silver medals, three World Cup titles, and a Grand Prix gold and represented Team USA at the 2014 Winter Olympics 
Blake Hillman, former NHL hockey defenseman with Chicago Blackhawks
Monty Hoyt, 1964 US Olympic figure skater
Lex Hudson, former NHL hockey player with Pittsburgh Penguins
Tommy Hugo, former Canadian Football Hall of Fame football player with Montreal Allouettes
Connor James, former NHL forward with Pittsburgh Penguins and Los Angeles Kings
Ray Johnson, NFL football player with Cleveland Rams 
Marshall Johnston, NHL and Canadian Olympic hockey forward (1964 and 1968), NHL coach and executive
Chris Kenady, former NHL forward with St. Louis Blues and New York Rangers
Yoram Kochavy, 1984 Olympic swimmer with Israel
Espen Kofstad, 2022 PGA Tour golfer and 2016 Olympic golfer with Norway
Cliff Koroll, former NHL winger with Chicago Blackhawks and later Blackhawks head coach
George Konik, former NHL player with Pittsburgh Penguins
Michelle Kwan, multiple World Champion figure skater, two-time Olympic medalist in 1998/2002, graduated June 2009
Antti Laaksonen, former NHL forward with Boston Bruins, Minnesota Wild and Colorado Avalanche, 2006 Olympic Silver Medal with Finland
Mike Lampman, former NHL player with St. Louis Blues, Vancouver Canucks and Washington Capitals
Richard Lapchick, sports human rights activist
Jim Leavins, former NHL defenseman with Detroit Red Wings and New York Rangers
Floyd Little, Hall of Fame running back, Denver Broncos (MS Judicial Admin '75)
Jessica López, Venezuelan three-time Olympic gymnast in 2008, 2012 and 2016
Pete LoPresti, former NHL goaltender with Minnesota North Stars and Edmonton Oilers
Aaron MacKenzie, former NHL defenseman with Colorado Avalanche
John MacMillan, former NHL forward and two-time Stanley Cup winner with Toronto Maple Leafs and Detroit Red Wings
Keith Magnuson, former NHL defenseman, Chicago Blackhawks and later Blackhawks head coach
Peter Mannino, former NHL goaltender with New York Islanders, Atlanta Thrashers and Winnipeg Jets
Brian Martin, with Mark Grimmette, two-time U.S. Olympic medalist luge pair, 1998 and 2002
Tom Martin, former NHL forward with Minnesota North Stars, Hartford Whalers and Winnipeg Jets
Bill Masterton, former NHL forward with Minnesota North Stars; namesake of the NHL's Bill Masterton Trophy
Dwight Mathiasen, former NHL forward with Pittsburgh Penguins
Derek Mayer, former NHL defenseman with Ottawa Senators, 1994 Canadian Olympian
Scott Mayfield, NHL defenseman with New York Islanders
Peter McNab, former NHL player with Buffalo Sabres, Boston Bruins and New Jersey Devils; former color analyst for the Colorado Avalanche
Dakota Mermis, NHL defenseman with Minnesota Wild, New Jersey Devils and Arizona Coyotes
Paul Messier, former NHL forward with Colorado Avalanche
Tom Miller, former NHL player with Detroit Red Wings and New York Islanders
Ian Mitchell, NHL defenseman with Chicago Blackhawks
Trevor Moore, NHL forward with Los Angeles Kings and Toronto Maple Leafs
Gavin Morgan, former NHL forward with Dallas Stars
George Morrison, former NHL forward with St. Louis Blues
Ade Murkey, NBA forward with Sacramento Kings
Logan O'Connor, NHL forward with Colorado Avalanche
Royce O'Neale, NBA forward with New Jersey Nets and Utah Jazz
Rob Palmer, former NHL forward with Chicago Blackhawks
Craig Patrick, former NHL player; Stanley-Cup winning NHL executive and assistant coach for 1980 US Olympic gold medal hockey team 
Matt Pettinger, former NHL forward with Washington Capitals, Vancouver Canucks and Tampa Bay Lightning
Ernie Pitts, Canadian Football Hall of Famer with Winnipeg Blue Bombers and British Columbia Lions
Gregg Popovich, head coach, NBA champion with San Antonio Spurs and 2020 U.S. Olympic Team 
Lynn Powis, former NHL forward with Chicago Blackhawks and Kansas City Scouts
Rich Preston, former NHL forward with Chicago Blackhawks and New Jersey Devils
Rhett Rakhshani, former NHL forward with New York Islanders
Craig Redmond, former NHL defenseman with Los Angeles Kings and Edmonton Oilers, 1984 Canadian Olympian
Mark Rycroft, former NHL forward with St. Louis Blues and Colorado Avalanche
Reggie Rivers, motivational speaker; former Denver Broncos running back
Willy Schaeffler, former University of Denver ski coach 1948–1972; former U.S. Ski Team Alpine director + coach 1968–1972
Dan Schatzeder, winning pitcher of Game 6 of the 1987 World Series, Minnesota Twins (and other MLB teams)
Jim Shea, Olympic cross-country skier
Andre Shinyashiki, MLS forward with Charlotte FC, Colorado Rapids, 2019 MLS Rookie of the Year 
Jim Shires, former NHL player with Detroit Red Wings, St. Louis Blues and Pittsburgh Penguins
Drew Shore, former NHL forward with Florida Panthers, Calgary Flames, Vancouver Canucks and Carolina Hurricanes
Nick Shore, former NHL forward with Winnipeg Jets, Toronto Maple Leafs, Ottawa Senators, Los Angeles Kings and Calgary Flames 
Brett Skinner, former NHL defenseman with New York Islanders
Graham Smith, MLS soccer defender with Sporting Kansas City 
Wayne Smith, former NHL player with Chicago Blackhawks
Don Stansauk, NFL defensive end with Green Bay Packers, later became pro wrestling legend and actor Hard Boiled Haggerty
Craig Stimac, former MLB catcher with San Diego Padres
Paul Stastny, NHL forward, Winnipeg Jets and Las Vegas Golden Knights, Colorado Avalanche and 2010 US Olympic silver medalist
Troy Terry, NHL forward with Anaheim Ducks, 2018 U.S. Olympic Team
Sarah Thomas, ultra-distance swimmer, first person, male or female, to ever swim English Channel four times non-stop
Jack Tising, former MLB pitcher with the Pittsburgh Pirates
Brock Trotter, former NHL forward with Montreal Canadiens
Vic Venasky, former NHL forward with Los Angeles Kings
Michelle Waterson, professional mixed martial artist for the UFC's Strawweight division
Patrick Wiercioch, former NHL defenseman with Ottawa Senators and Colorado Avalanche
Joe Willis, MLS goalkeeper with Nashville SC, Houston Dynamo, and Washington D.C. United
Jim Wiste, former NHL forward with Chicago Blackhawks and Vancouver Canucks
John Woudenberg, former NFL player with Pittsburgh Steelers and San Francisco 49ers, 1942 Pro Bowl
Jason Zucker, NHL forward with Pittsburgh Penguins and Minnesota Wild

Literature, music, and the arts
Chris Broderick, heavy metal guitarist (Megadeth, Jag Panzer, Nevermore)
C.J. Box, novelist
Charlie Burrell, bassist
Mary Coyle Chase, playwright, wrote broadway hit Harvey
Sandra Dallas, writer and novelist
Joan Dickinson, artist, writer, and teacher
Ed Dwight, first African-American astronaut trainee, sculptor
Victoria Fuller, artist and sculptor
Peter Gay, historian and educator
Aaron Gwyn, author and professor
Mark Harris, author, Bang the Drum Slowly 
Elizabeth Orpha Sampson Hoyt (1828–1912), philosopher, author, lecturer
Elliot Martin, Broadway producer and director
Duane Michals, art photographer
Ken Michelman, TV actor, The White Shadow, Grey's Anatomy, The West WingMary Obering, noted modern abstract painter
Isidore Okpewho, scholar of African oral literature, novelist
Frank Mechau, major Western artist
Scott Mitchell Rosenberg, Film Producer, Men in Black, Cowboys and Aliens
Paul Quinichette, tenor saxophonist
Ted Shackelford, television actor, Knots Landing''
Paul Sharits, avant-garde/abstract filmmaker
Ted Shawn, modern dancer
Neil Simon, playwright and screenwriter 
Sinbad, born David Adkins, comedian and actor
Rodney Stark, author, professor, and sociologist of religion 
Morton Subotnick, electronic musician
Hao Jiang Tian, basso cantante opera singer
Josh Taylor, comedy and dramatic television actor 
Cedar Walton, jazz pianist
John Edward Williams, author
Wilson Bryan Key, author

Other
Margaret L. Curry, state parole officer
Sumiko Hennessy (MSW, 1963), Japanese-American academic, social worker, and activist for the Asian American community in Denver
Harold Franklin, Professor, first Black student at Auburn University
Nancy Golden, Professor, Chief Education Officer of Oregon, 2013-1015 
Mary Ann Kerwin, J.D. 1986, co-founder of the La Leche League
Dottie Lamm (MSW, 1967), former First Lady of Colorado
Sue Miller (M.A. counseling psychology and counselor education, 2009), breast cancer activist
Pauline Short Robinson (B.S. 1943), first African-American librarian in Denver

References